Tiziano Frieri (born 22 December 1944 in Nanto) is an Italian retired footballer. He played as a striker. He is the son of the guardian of Stadio Romeo Menti. He played for Lanerossi Vicenza youth teams and then in lower series for Juve Stabia, Puteolana, Marsala, Lecce and Acireale.

Career
1958-1964 L.R. Vicenza  ? (70)
1964-1965 A.C. Schio ? (10)
1965-1967  Juve Stabia  ? (28)
1967-1968  Puteolana  ? (23)
1968-1969  Marsala  ? (17)
1969 Como ? (0)
1969-1971  Lecce 32 (18)
1971-1973  Acireale ? (26)
1973-1975 Nuorese ? (15)

References

1944 births
Living people
Italian footballers
U.S. Lecce players
S.S. Juve Stabia players
Association football forwards